Sharlyksky District is an administrative and municipal district (raion), one of the thirty-five in Orenburg Oblast, Russia. It is located in the northwest of the oblast. Its administrative center is the rural locality (a selo) of Sharlyk. Population: 18,032 (2010 Census);  The population of Sharlyk accounts for 42.0% of the total district's population.

Famous natives
Sagit Agish was a Bashkir poet, writer and playwright.

References

Notes

Sources

Districts of Orenburg Oblast